
Susquehanna–Dauphin is a subway station on SEPTA's Broad Street Line in Philadelphia, Pennsylvania.  The station is located at the 2200 block of North Broad Street in North Philadelphia, between Susquehanna Avenue at the south end and Dauphin Street at the north end.  Four tracks travel through the station, however the station is only served by local trains, which travel on the outer two tracks.  Along with Cecil B. Moore station, this stop provides access to Temple University, which is located one block south of Susquehanna Avenue.  Service began at the station, formerly known as Dauphin–Susquehanna, on September 1, 1928, as part of the original segment of the Broad Street Line, which ran from City Hall station to Olney station.

Until February 25, 1956, Trolley Routes 8 and 39 (now a bus line) service as the stations connections which travels westbound on Susquehanna Avenue to the Strawberry Mansion neighborhood, and eastbound on Dauphin Street to the Kensington neighborhood.

Station layout
Fares are collected at the center of the platforms on each side of the tracks, as there is no crossover built at this station.

Station mural
The station features a mural entitled City Diary, created by Philadelphia children in 1997.  The mural consists of many 8 in2 (20.32 cm2) ceramic tiles, split into two pieces on opposite sides of the station, with lengths of 28 ft (8.53 m) and 19 ft (5.79 m), respectively.  Over 170 children between the ages of 6 and 16 contributed to the project, which was dedicated to the station on June 11, 1997.

Gallery

References

External links
 

 Dauphin Street entrance from Google Maps Street View
 Susquehanna Avenue entrance from Google Maps Street View

SEPTA Broad Street Line stations
Railway stations in the United States opened in 1928
Railway stations located underground in Pennsylvania